Peggy Drake (6 October 1922 – 19 September 2014), was an Austrian born American film and television actress. She primarily appeared in B-movies of the 1940s.

Career
Born Lieselotte Mayer in Vienna, Austria, she moved to the United States with her family at the age of three. Her acting career started with an uncredited role in the film Too Many Girls (1940). Her career was short-lived, appearing in five films between 1940 and 1942, most notably in the serial film King of the Mounties, a continuation of the King of the Royal Mounted film series.

While filming The Tuttles of Tahiti with Charles Laughton (on a sound stage in Culver City), Drake became seriously ill with pneumonia, delaying filming for two months, and causing her to lose so much weight that she had to adopt a diet of sweet potato pudding to regain her figure before filming resumed.

She left the business after 1942, but has appeared occasionally in film in uncredited roles. She appeared in one episode of the television series A Family at War (1970).

She died on 19 September 2014, aged 91.

Filmography

References

External links

1922 births
2014 deaths
Austrian emigrants to the United States
American film actresses
American television actresses
20th-century American actresses
Actresses from Vienna
21st-century American women